The 2005 European Wrestling Championships was held from 12 to 17 April 2005 in Varna, Bulgaria.

Medal table

Medal summary

Men's freestyle

Men's Greco-Roman

Women's freestyle

References

External links

Europe
W
European Wrestling Championships
Euro
2005 in European sport